The women's 400 metres event  at the 1998 European Athletics Indoor Championships was held 28 February–1 March.

Medalists

Results

Heats
The winner of each heat (Q) and the next 3 fastest (q) qualified for the final.

Final

References

400 metres at the European Athletics Indoor Championships
400
1998 in women's athletics